The USC Upstate Spartans men's basketball team represents the University of South Carolina Upstate in Spartanburg, South Carolina, United States.  The school's team formerly competed in the ASUN Conference, but moved to the Big South Conference in 2018–19. They are currently led by Head Coach Dave Dickerson and play their home games at the G. B. Hodge Center. During their time as a member of the NAIA, they were national champions in 1982. Since their move to Division I, they have yet to qualify for the NCAA tournament.

Postseason

CIT results
The Spartans have appeared in four CollegeInsider.com Postseason Tournaments (CIT). Their record in the CIT is 2–4.

The Basketball Classic results
The Spartans have appeared in The Basketball Classic one time. Their record is 1–1.

CBI results
The Spartans have appeared in one College Basketball Invitational (CBI) tournament. Their record is 0–1.

NCAA Division II Tournament results
The Spartans have appeared in six NCAA Division II Tournaments. Their record is 5–6.

NAIA Tournament results
The Spartans have appeared in three NAIA Tournaments. Their combined record is 8–2 and were national champions in 1982.

References

External links
 Team website